Rhenium fluoride can refer to
Rhenium(VI) fluoride (rhenium hexafluoride, ReF6), a liquid, or yellow solid
Rhenium(VII) fluoride (rhenium heptafluoride, ReF7), a liquid, or bright yellow solid

Rhenium compounds